The 1934 United States Senate election in Montana took place on November 6, 1934. Incumbent United States Senator Burton K. Wheeler, who was first elected to the Senate in 1922, and was re-elected in 1928, ran for re-election. After easily winning the Democratic primary, Wheeler moved on to the general election, where he faced George M. Bourquin, a former United States Federal Judge and the Republican nominee. In a stark contrast to his close campaign in 1928, Wheeler won re-election to his third Senate term in a landslide.

Democratic primary

Candidates
Burton K. Wheeler, incumbent United States Senator
Bert Replogle, attorney

Results

Republican primary

Candidates
George M. Bourquin, former United States Federal Judge of the United States District Court for the District of Montana
O. H. P. Shelley

Results

General election

Results

References

Montana
1934
1934 Montana elections